Torsten Thure Renvall (23 October 1817 – 16 October 1898) was the Archbishop of Turku, and the spiritual head of the Evangelical Lutheran Church of Finland between 1884 and 1898.

Biography
Renvall was born on October 23, 1817 in Turku, the son of Henrik Renvall and Agneta Cornelia Cairenius. He graduated with a Bachelor of Philosophy in 1840 and as a Docent in History in 1845. He taught history in Vaasa high school from 1845 to 1851 and then at Turku high school from 1852 till 1858. Between 1846 and 1847 he contributed to the Vasabladet and founded the Ilmarinen magazine in Finnish between 1848 and 1850. He was ordained a priest in 1857. Among others, Renvall participated in the reform of the Church Act and was a member of the January Committee of 1862. He received the Doctor of Theology in 1864. He served as Dean of Turku between 1858 and 1884. 

In 1884 he was appointed Archbishop of Turku. However, due to the fact that all the Finnish bishops had died there was no available bishop to consecrate Renvall. As Finland was then an autonomous Grand Duchy under Russian rule, it was politically impossible to obtain a foreign bishop for consecrations. Hence, the oldest theological professor, Axel Fredrik Granfelt, was commissioned to consecrate the new archbishop.  This in turn broke the apostolic succession which was brought into the Finnish Church by its mother church, the Church of Sweden. The apostolic succession was reinstated in the Finnish church in 1934 through the consecration of Aleksi Lehtonen who was co-consecrated by the Archbishop of Uppsala Erling Eidem.

Renvall's married his first wife, Emilia Maria Lovisa Bergenstråle, in 1843 and remarried in 1865 to Amanda Sofia Limnell.

References

External links
Torsten Ture R. 

1817 births
1898 deaths
People from Turku
People from Turku and Pori Province (Grand Duchy of Finland)
Lutheran archbishops and bishops of Turku
Members of the Diet of Finland
19th-century Lutheran archbishops